Daunian Mountains (in Italian Monti della Daunia or Monti Dauni, or also improperly Subappennino Dauno) are a mountain range in southern Italy, constituting the eastern appendix of the Campanian Apennines. They occupy the western fringe of Capitanata and the border of Apulia with Molise and Campania; the range takes its name from an ancient Italic tribe, the Dauni, although it was strongly held by Hirpini instead.

The mountains and hills are bounded northwards by the Fortore valley, eastwards by the Tavoliere delle Puglie, southwards by the upper Ofanto valley. The chain is formed by sandstone terrains, and is the source of a series of small streams which flow through the Tavoliere into the Adriatic Sea.

Historically, the Daunian Mountains have suffered a substantial depopulation in the last decades, due to their relative isolation. They include 21 comuni, all in the province of Foggia, which form two mountain communities (Comunità Montana dei Monti Dauni Settentrionali , with seat at Casalnuovo Monterotaro, and the Comunità Montana dei Monti Dauni Meridionali, at Bovino).

Highest peaks

References

External links

Mountains of Apulia
Mountain ranges of the Apennines